The 1960 Provincial Speedway League was the first season of the re-incarnated Provincial League, ten motorcycle speedway teams took part.

Summary
The league was dominated by Rayleigh, Poole and Bristol. Rayleigh and Poole finished on the same points, but Rayleigh triumphed with a superior number of race points scored. At the end of the season Liverpool and Yarmouth folded and Bristol closed after their track was sold for redevelopment.

Final table

M = Matches; W = Wins; D = Draws; L = Losses; Pts = Total Points

Top Five Riders (League only)

Provincial League Knockout Cup
The 1960 Provincial League Knockout Cup was the first edition of the Knockout Cup for the Provincial League teams. Bristol Bulldogs were the winners.

First round

Second round

Semifinals

Final

See also
List of United Kingdom Speedway League Champions
Knockout Cup (speedway)

References

Speedway Provincial League
1960 in speedway